Duanesburg-Florida Baptist Church is a historic Baptist church on NY 30 in Duanesburg, Schenectady County, New York. It was built between 1868 and 1869 and is a three-by-four-bay frame building with a gable roof in a vernacular Greek Revival style.  It features an engaged central square tower with a pyramidal roof erected as part of the front facade in 1891.  Also on the property is a contributing church hall dated to about 1913.

The property was covered in a 1984 study of Duanesburg historical resources.
It was listed on the National Register of Historic Places in 1984.

References

External links
 Photograph of the church
 Church website

Baptist churches in New York (state)
Churches on the National Register of Historic Places in New York (state)
Churches completed in 1868
Churches in Schenectady County, New York
National Register of Historic Places in Schenectady County, New York